Anna Arena (June 21, 1919 – August 19, 1974) was an Italian film actress.

Selected filmography
 Jealousy (1942)
 Vacation with a Gangster (1951)
 The Piano Tuner Has Arrived (1952)
 Beauties in Capri (1952)
 The Dream of Zorro (1952)
 The Ship of Condemned Women (1953)
 La lupa (1953)
 Orphan of the Ghetto (1954)
 It Takes Two to Sin in Love (1954)
 The Law (1959)
 Il bell'Antonio (1960)
 Queen of the Seas (1961)
 Hercules Against Rome (1964)

References

Bibliography 
 Gary Allen Smith. Epic Films: Casts, Credits and Commentary on More Than 350 Historical Spectacle Movies. McFarland, 2004.

External links 
 

1919 births
1974 deaths
Italian film actresses
People from Quiliano